Murrayshall Country Estate & Golf Club, in  Scone, Perth and Kinross, Scotland, features two 20th-century golf courses surrounding a 17th-century house. The golf courses were completed in 1981, having received approval from the Tayside Planning and Development Committee in 1976.

The architect of Murrayshall Course was J. Hamilton Stutt (1924–2008).

The 41-bedroom Murrayshall House was built by Andrew Murray, son of Andrew Murray, 1st Lord Balvaird, in 1664. The building, which was later owned by Francis Norie-Miller, was put on the market for £4-million in 2015. It was voted Central Scotland and Fife's Golf Hotel of the Year shortly beforehand. Hetherly Capital Partners purchased the property in 2016, and later undertook a £10-million regeneration project, to a design by Fergus Purdie Architects.

In 2021, the new owners submitted plans to: add a further fifty rooms to its hotel, create a golf academy and driving range, build fifty new homes, forty self-catering cottages and twenty-five tree houses or glamping pods.

References

External links 

Golf clubs and courses in Perth and Kinross
1981 establishments in Scotland
Sports venues in Perth and Kinross